The Lily of Killarney is an opera in three acts by Julius Benedict. The libretto, by John Oxenford and Dion Boucicault, is based on Boucicault's own play The Colleen Bawn. The opera received its premiere at Covent Garden Theatre, London on Monday 10 February 1862.

Background
The Lily of Killarney became the most widely performed of Benedict's operas. It has been linked with Balfe's The Bohemian Girl and Wallace's Maritana as 'The Irish Ring'. Its convincing handling of  Irish idiom is interesting considering Benedict's German-Jewish origins. Some of the opera's songs – notably The moon hath raised her lamp above and Eily Mavourneen – remain in the repertoire. The opera is mentioned in James Joyce's Ulysses and Djuna Barnes' Nightwood.

Roles

Synopsis
 Time: Late 18th century.
 Place: In and around Killarney.

Act One

At Tore Cregan, the ancestral home of Hardress Cregan, guests praise the 'bachelor' heir, paying little heed to the fact that Cregan is secretly married to Eily (the 'Colleen Bawn' = Gaelic 'the fair maid'), the eponymous Lily of Killarney. They go off to an impromptu moonlight race between the horses of the two of the guests. Mrs Cregan is now left alone, and to her enters Corrigan, a 'middle man' who holds a mortgage on the Tore Cregan estates. Corrigan threatens to dispossess Cregan and his mother, who have mortgaged their lands to him, unless Cregan marries the heiress Ann Shute. Danny the boatman is now heard singing 'off'. Corrigan informs Mrs Cregan that he is waiting to row her son over the water to visit Eily.

In Eily's cottage, Father Tom urges her to persuade Hardress to proclaim their marriage to the world, but Hardress arrives and asks Eily to give up the certificate of their marriage altogether. Myles and the priest intervene, and Hardress departs enraged.

Act Two

Back at Tore Cregan, Hardress is reluctantly wooing Ann Shute, while Corrigan turns his attention towards Mrs Cregan. Danny determines to resolve the situation by killing Eily. Cregan demurs, but the unwitting Mrs. Cregan is persuaded by Danny to give him one on her son's gloves as a token for Eily's death. Primed with strong drink, Danny goes to put his scheme into execution at Eily's hut. Myles tries to dissuade Eily from going with him, but the sight of Hardress's glove convinces her that all is well. Danny rows her to a lonely cave.

Outside the cave, Danny, thinking that he has Eily at his mercy, tells her that she must either surrender her marriage certificate to him or take it with her to the bottom of the lake. Myles, who uses the cave as a refuge, mistakes Danny for otter and shoots him. He then proceeds to rescue Eily and bear her away with him.

Act Three

Hardress, believing Eily to be dead, is about to be married to Miss Shute. Danny, however, makes a confession on the point of death of the plot against Eily and suspicion falls on Hardress as the instigator of the scheme. On the wedding morning Corrigan arranges that soldiers will come and arrest the  bridegroom. Then Myles produces Eily, alive, and Hardress acknowledges her as his lawful wife. Mrs Cregan relates how it was she who gave the glove to Danny. The opera ends with the joy of Hardress and Eily, and the discomfiture of Corrigan. Myles consoles Miss Shute with the reminder that he, too, is doomed to love in vain.

Sources
Nigel Burton, The Lily of Killarney in Grove Music Online
The Viking Opera Guide ed. Holden (Viking, 1993)
J. Walker McSpadden, Opera Synopses (George G. Harrap & Company, 1922)

Notes

Operas by Julius Benedict
English-language operas
1862 operas
Operas
Operas set in Ireland
Opera world premieres at the Theatre Royal, Covent Garden
Operas based on plays